( “The Stone of Help” or “The Rock of the ”) is a section of Rabbi Jacob ben Asher's compilation of halakha (Jewish law), Arba'ah Turim. This section treats aspects of Jewish law related to marriage, divorce, and sexual conduct. Later, Rabbi Yosef Karo modeled the framework of his own compilation of practical Jewish law, the Shulchan Aruch, after the Arba'ah Turim. Many later commentators used this framework as well. Thus, "Even Ha'ezer" in common usage may refer to an area of halakha non-specific to Rabbi Jacob ben Asher's compilation.

See also
The other three sections of Arba'ah Turim and other works borrowing its organizational scheme are:
Orach Chayim
Yoreh De'ah
Choshen Mishpat

References

Rabbinic legal texts and responsa
Hebrew words and phrases in Jewish law
Hebrew-language religious books